Lynn Marie Gibson (born 1969), is a female former athlete who competed for England.

Athletics career
Gibson was the English national champion after winning the 1998 AAA Championships.

She represented England in the 1,500 metres event, at the 1994 Commonwealth Games in Victoria, British Columbia, Canada. Four years later she represented England again, at the 1998 Commonwealth Games in Kuala Lumpur, Malaysia.

References

1969 births
English female middle-distance runners
Sportspeople from Oxford
Athletes (track and field) at the 1994 Commonwealth Games
Living people
Commonwealth Games competitors for England